The Zhongxian Yangtze River Bridge is a suspension bridge over the Yangtze River in Zhong County of Chongqing, China. In 2006, the bridge received the Lu Ban Award for engineering excellence.

See also
List of longest suspension bridge spans
Yangtze River bridges and tunnels

External links
https://web.archive.org/web/20160304032000/http://www.schdri.com/projecthonor/project/3084.htm

References

Bridges in Chongqing
Bridges over the Yangtze River
Suspension bridges in China
Bridges completed in 2001